Lilkee is a 2006 children's film in Hindi produced by Children's Film Society, India, and directed by Batul Mukhtiyar. The film is about a 10-year-old domestic help in Mumbai. and was released on 5 October 2006.

Plot
It is a story of a girl named Lilkee girl from the mountains of Nainital. Like all other girls from the poor families, Lilkee is expected to work and earn. Lilkee is brought to Mumbai by Bela for housework. Lilkee gets involved in household chores and takes care of Bela's child. Even though she falls under the weight of a routine, she misses Nainital. In Mumbai, Lilkee finds a few friends to play with. However, they soon realize she is a housemaid. And how her sense of responsibility makes her employer to admit her in school is the remaining story.

Cast
 Airman Mukhtiyar
 Anushka Panwala
Saloni Joshi
Anushka Joshi
 Md. Mukhtiyar
Suresh Bhatia
Nazneen Madan

Festivals
In 2009, it was shown as a part of the 'Sadak Chhap Film Fest', a street film festival for children in Bangalore. It also screened at the 'Filmi Chashma Film Festival', at National Film Archive of India, Pune in 2011.

References

External links

 Lilkee, website

Indian children's films
2006 films
2000s Hindi-language films
Films set in Mumbai